The 2011 Abia State House of Assembly election was held on April 26, 2011, to elect members of the Abia State House of Assembly in Nigeria. All the 24 seats were up for election in the Abia State House of Assembly.

Results

Osisioma South 
PDP candidate Emeka Alozie won the election.

Umuahia North 
PDP candidate Emeka Ejiogu won the election.

Umuahia Central 
PDP candidate Grace Nkera Uche won the election.

Isiala Ngwa North 
PDP candidate Martins Azubuike won the election.

Isiala Ngwa South 
PDP candidate Darlington Nwokocha won the election.

Isuikwuato 
PDP candidate Chukwudi Ogele won the election.

Umuahia East 
PDP candidate Chidiebere Nwoke won the election.

Umunneochi 
PDP candidate Ikedi Ezekwesiri won the election.

Ukwa West 
PDP candidate Mezie Nwaubani won the election.

Ukwa East 
PDP candidate Allwell Asiforo Okere won the election.

Obingwa East 
PDP candidate Princewill Chilaka won the election.

Obingwa West 
PDP candidate Uche Nwankpa won the election.

Umuahia South 
PDP candidate Chidi Nwosu won the election.

Ikwuano 
PDP candidate Emeka Osoagbaka won the election.

Ugwunagbo 
PDP candidate Humphery Azubuike won the election.

Ohafia North 
PDP candidate Ude Oko Chukwu won the election.

Aba Central 
PDP candidate Kate Maduako won the election.

Osisioma North 
PDP candidate Ikechukwu Nwabeke won the election.

Aba North 
PDP candidate Blessing Nwagba won the election.

Arochukwu 
PDP candidate Agwu U. Agwu won the election.

Aba South 
PDP candidate Nwogu Iheasinmo won the election.

Bende North 
PDP candidate Ndukwe Ojukwu won the election.

Bende South 
PDP candidate Princewill Onyegbu won the election.

Ohafia South 
PDP candidate Mba Ukaha won the election.

References 

Abia State House of Assembly elections
2011 Nigerian House of Assembly elections